Dr. Liesel Holler Sotomayor (born 1980) is a Peruvian doctor, model and former beauty pageant titleholder who won the titles of Miss Peru 2004 and Miss Caraibes Hibiscus 2004.

Pageantry
Holler represented the department of Pasco in the Miss Perú 2004 competition on the night of April 19th, 2004. She was crowned Miss Peru Universe as a major shock during the final telecast by edging out the main favorite Maria Julia Mantilla who was crowned Miss World Peru 2004 and months later won the Miss World 2004 pageant.

Her surprise national title win gave her the right to represent her country at the Miss Universe 2004 pageant in Quito, Ecuador, where she failed to reach the semifinals. 

That same year, Holler was given the opportunity to compete in the Miss Earth 2004 pageant in Quezon City, Philippines, where she placed among the Top 16 finalists. She was Peru's second placement in Miss Earth history. To end the year, she participated in her third and final pageant in the Caribbean island of St. Martin to compete for the title of Miss Caraïbes Hibiscus where she emerged as the winner after beating the other contestants from Latin America.

References

Living people
1980 births
Peruvian female models
Miss Earth delegates
Miss Universe 2004 contestants
Peruvian people of German descent
Umeå University alumni
Peruvian beauty pageant winners